Lafleur or LaFleur or la Fleur' or variation, may refer to

People
 Abel Lafleur (1875–1953), French sculptor
 Art LaFleur (1943–2021), American actor
 David LaFleur (born 1974), American former National Football League player
 Eric la Fleur (born 1979), Swedish former Olympic swimmer
 Eric LaFleur (born 1964), American attorney and politician
 Greg LaFleur (born 1958), American former National Football League player
 Guy Lafleur (1951–2022), Canadian Hall-of-Fame former National Hockey League player
 Jacques Lafleur (1932–2010), French politician
 Jean Lafleur, Canadian businessman involved in a sponsorship scandal
 Joseph Verbis Lafleur, (1912-1944), Catholic priest and US Army chaplain, cited for heroic action in World War II
 Matt LaFleur (born 1979), American National Football League coach
 Mike LaFleur (born 1987), American National Football League coach
 Pierre-Auguste Lafleur (1872–1954), Canadian politician in Quebec
 Rene Lafleur (1899–1968), Canadian ice hockey player
 Sarah Lafleur, Canadian actress
 Violette Lafleur (1897–1965), Egyptologist, conservator and curator

Fictional characters
 Ricky LaFleur, in Trailer Park Boys, played by Rob Wells
 James LaFleur, a pseudonym of James "Sawyer" Ford, on the American television show Lost
 Jacques LaFleur, in Harry and the Hendersons, played by David Suchet
 Peter LaFleur, the protagonist of Dodgeball: A True Underdog Story, played by Vince Vaughn

Other uses
 Château Lafleur, a Bordeaux wine producer in Pomerol
 Lafleur (brand), a Canadian cooked meats brand
 Lafleur Restaurants, a Canadian chain of fast food restaurants
 "LaFleur" (Lost), an episode of the television series Lost
 Lafleur (marionette), a French marionette from Amiens
 Lafleur (medication), a medication containing dienogest and estradiol valerate

See also 

 The flower (disambiguation)
 Fleur (disambiguation)